This is the list of cathedrals in Dominica sorted by denomination.

Roman Catholic 
Cathedrals of the Roman Catholic Church in Dominica:
Roseau Cathedral, Roseau

See also
Lists of cathedrals

References

Cathedrals
Dominica
Cathedrals